Héroux-Devtek Inc. is an international company specializing in the design, development, manufacture, repair and overhaul of landing gear, actuation systems and components for the aerospace market. Founded in 1942, the company's head office is located in Longueuil, Quebec. Héroux-Devtek Inc. has more than 1960 employees working in 18 facilities in North America and Europe. The corporation is the third-largest landing gear company worldwide, supplying both the commercial and defence sectors of the Aerospace market with new landing gear systems and components, as well as aftermarket products and services. It also manufactures actuation systems as well as ball screws. Héroux-Devtek's accomplishments include the manufacturing of the landing gear for the lunar module that landed Neil Armstrong on the moon for the Apollo 11 mission in 1969.

Héroux-Devtek recorded sales of $483.9 million for the fiscal year ended March 31, 2019.

History
source

1942 : Founding of Héroux Machine Parts Limited in Longueuil, Quebec

1960 : Beginning of design and manufacturing operations of landing gear components.  

1969 : Manufacturing of the landing gear for the Apollo Lunar Module in 1969.

1985 : Merging of the corporation (On June 26, 1985)  with 2320-4894 Québec Inc., a management company incorporated by the corporation's then two senior executives, Gilles Labbé and Sarto Richer, in connection with the sale by Bombardier Inc. of its shares in the corporation.

1986 : Héroux Inc. becomes a publicly traded company.

1987 :  McSwain Manufacturing Corporation, a producer of gas turbine components, is acquired by Héroux Inc.

1999 : Métro Machining Corporation and Les Industries C.A.T. Inc. is acquired by Héroux Inc.

2000 : Devtek Corporation is acquired by Héroux Inc. to enhance its landing gear capabilities in the commercial sector.  The company changes its name to Héroux‑Devtek Inc.

2004 : Progressive Inc. of Arlington, Texas, a manufacturer of complex military aircraft structural components, is acquired by Héroux-Devtek Inc.

2007-2008 : The company obtained major design contracts to develop landing gear systems for the Learjet-85, Sikorsky CH-53K, and Embraer Legacy 450-500.

2010 : Eagle Tool & Machine Co. and E2 Precision Products of Ohio, manufacturers of precision machined components for the aerospace industry are acquired by Héroux-Devtek Inc.

2012 : Sale of substantially all of its Aerostructure and Industrial Products operations to Precision Castparts Corp.

2013 : Héroux-Devtek Inc. signs a long-term contract with The Boeing Company to supply complete landing gear systems for the Boeing 777 and 777X programs.

2014 : APPH, an integrated provider of landing gear and hydraulic systems and assemblies for original equipment manufacturer and aftermarket applications is acquired by Héroux-Devtek.

2017 : 75th anniversary of Héroux-Devtek.

2018 : Acquisition agreement of Beaver and CESA.

2019 : Gilles Labbé is appointed as Executive Chairman of the Board and Martin Brassard is appointed as president and Chief Executive Officer. Héroux-Devtek acquires Alta-Precision, a Montreal-based manufacturer of high-precision landing-gear components, as well as a majority stake in Tekalia Aeronautik.

Management
Gilles Labbé is the Executive chairman of the board, Martin Brassard is the President and chief executive officer, and Stéphane Arsenault is the Vice president and chief financial officer.

Production facilities
The company's headquarters are situated in Longueuil, Québec, Canada. It also holds production facilities in the greater Montreal area as well as in the US, the UK and Spain.

Canada
Longueuil, Quebec, manufacturing, repair and overhaul services in the landing gear industry as well as surface treatment and assembly of medium to large size landing gear systems.
Saint-Hubert, Quebec, landing gear drop testing with a capacity of up to 100,000 lbs, complete system testing, fatigue and strength testing.
Montréal, Quebec
Tekalia Aeronautik, surface treatment services
Alta Précision (HD Montréal), manufacturer of high precision landing gear components.
Laval, Quebec, small to medium landing gear systems and components,  flight control actuators.
Kitchener, Ontario, machining of medium to large-size landing gear components.
Cambridge, Ontario, machining of B-777 large size landing gear components.
Toronto, Ontario machining and assembly of complex precision parts, structural components and electrical chassis with integral heat exchangers.

United States
Springfield, Ohio, manufacturing of medium to large complex landing gear and titanium components.
Strongsville, Ohio, finishing and assembly of landing gear.
Wichita, Kansas, repair and overhaul activities, as well as manufacturing of hydraulic systems and components.
Everett, Washington, final assembly of the B-777 landing gear.
Livonia, Michigan (Beaver Aerospace & Defence), design and manufacturing of ball screws and actuation systems.

United Kingdom
Runcorn, Cheshire, manufacturing, repair and overhaul for the landing gear industry.
Nottingham, Nottinghamshire, manufacturing of small to medium landing gear components.
Bolton, Greater Manchester, design, manufacturing and assembly of filters and testing of fluid filtration applications.

Spain
Seville, Seville, assembly and installation of aircraft components at customer assembly lines.
Getafe, Madrid, design and manufacturing of ball screws and actuation systems.

References 

https://www.herouxdevtek.com/fr
https://www.lapresse.ca/affaires/entreprises/201911/15/01-5249928-la-fulgurante-croissance-dheroux-devtek.php
https://montrealgazette.com/business/local-business/aerospace/heroux-devtek-is-looking-for-150-quebec-workers-as-backlog-hits-record
https://www.lapresse.ca/affaires/entreprises/201911/08/01-5248960-heroux-devtek-hausse-son-profit.php

External links
Official website
News and events
Financial documents
Annual report 2019

Companies listed on the Toronto Stock Exchange
Manufacturing companies based in Quebec
Manufacturing companies established in 1942
Aerospace companies of Canada
Companies based in Longueuil
Canadian brands
Space industry companies of Canada
1942 establishments in Quebec
Aircraft undercarriage manufacturers